Hugh Bryan Hester (August 5, 1895 – November 25, 1983) was U.S. Army Brigadier General. He was a decorated officer in both World Wars. Later in life, he was a noted critic of U.S. foreign policy.

Education and career
Hugh Hester was born in Hester, North Carolina, and attended the University of North Carolina, graduating in 1917. Hester enlisted in the Army during World War I and became a second lieutenant in the 12th Field Artillery of the 2nd Infantry Division. In 1918, he was promoted to captain and participated in the occupation of Germany in 1919. He was wounded in action and was awarded the Silver Star and the Croix de Guerre.

After the war, Hester worked as an ROTC instructor (1924–1928) at the University of Missouri. In the 1930s, he joined the Quartermaster's Corps, working in New Mexico, and gaining the rank of colonel. A career officer in the army, he served under General MacArthur in the Pacific Theater, in supply and procurement (1942–1945). After the war, he became chief of the U.S. Food and Agriculture Program in Germany. This led to the award of the French Legion of Honor. In 1947-48, Hester was appointed the military attache to Australia. He worked as commanding General of the Philadelphia Quartermaster Depot until his retirement as a brigadier general in 1951.

Later years
After retirement from the Army, Hester studied at University of North Carolina at Chapel Hill, University of Pennsylvania, and George Washington University, in the areas of law and international relations, but did not earn a degree. Hester was an outspoken opponent of U.S. foreign policy for the remainder of his life. He published a book, "On the Brink", with Dr. Jerome Davis in 1959. It expressed concerns about the Cold War and suggested that new U.S. policies were needed. Hester was a common speaker at peace rallies in the 1960s and authored many opinion and editorial pieces. He was a special correspondent for The Nation, The Churchman, and U.S. Farm News, as well as a speaker on the lecture circuit. He was designated the honorary commander of a Vietnam Veterans Against the War protest march in 1970. In 1971, he published "Twenty-Six Disastrous Years" which criticized U.S. foreign policy. Hester argued for disarmament, weapons control, and world government.

Personal life
Hugh Bryan Hester was born in Hester, North Carolina on August 5, 1895 to William Alexander Hester and Marietta Bullock (Hester). He married Pauline Hester Green in 1935. She died January 8, 1981. Hugh Hester died of natural causes on November 25, 1983 in Asheville, North Carolina.

In 1987, his estate endowed the Hester Center of Peace and Justice at Mars Hill University.

References and links
Hugh B. Hester at D.H. Ramsey Library, University of North Carolina at Asheville
Hugh B. Hester at Joyner Library, East Carolina University
Hester Birth Record at Granville County, North Carolina, U.S. GenWeb Project
 Hugh B. Hester Papers 1 and  Hugh B. Hester Papers 2 at Clemson University Special Collections Library

Specific

1895 births
1983 deaths
United States Army personnel of World War I
United States Army personnel of World War II
Military history of the Philippines
United States Army generals
American anti–Vietnam War activists
Recipients of the Silver Star